Gary John Anderson  (born 18 September 1967) is a former track and road cyclist from New Zealand who won an Olympic bronze medal and three Commonwealth Games gold medals.

Cycling career
Anderson attended four Olympics.  He finished third in the 4000m pursuit at the 1992 Olympic Games in Barcelona, Spain, and achieved the following placings at his other games:

1988 Seoul (4000m Ind. Pursuit): 7th
1996 Atlanta (4000m Ind. Pursuit): 13th
2000 Sydney (4000m Ind. Pursuit): 6th

Anderson won eight medals at the Commonwealth Games, including three golds at the 1990 Commonwealth Games in Auckland.

In the 1990 Queen's Birthday Honours, Anderson was appointed a Member of the Order of the British Empire, for services to cycling. He was also awarded the New Zealand 1990 Commemoration Medal.

Anderson raced with a heart defect which could make his heart race under stress.  He was in top form prior to the 1998 Commonwealth Games in Kuala Lumpur but was injured in a crash and instead commentated for Television New Zealand. After returning for his final Games in Sydney he turned to coaching and managing.

Personal life
In 1999 while at the New Zealand National track cycling championships, Anderson was involved in an altercation with a member of the Ulysses Motorcycle Club. This resulted in an inquiry by Cycling New Zealand into the matter.

References

External links
 

1967 births
Living people
English emigrants to New Zealand
New Zealand male cyclists
Olympic bronze medalists for New Zealand
Cyclists at the 1988 Summer Olympics
Cyclists at the 1992 Summer Olympics
Cyclists at the 1996 Summer Olympics
Cyclists at the 2000 Summer Olympics
Olympic cyclists of New Zealand
Cyclists from Greater London
Cyclists from Auckland
Commonwealth Games gold medallists for New Zealand
Commonwealth Games silver medallists for New Zealand
Commonwealth Games bronze medallists for New Zealand
Cyclists at the 1986 Commonwealth Games
Cyclists at the 1990 Commonwealth Games
Olympic medalists in cycling
New Zealand Members of the Order of the British Empire
Medalists at the 1992 Summer Olympics
Commonwealth Games medallists in cycling
New Zealand track cyclists
Medallists at the 1986 Commonwealth Games
Medallists at the 1990 Commonwealth Games